Nicholas Purcell FBA is Camden Professor of Ancient History and a fellow of Brasenose College, Oxford.  Before holding this post he was University Lecturer in Ancient History at the University of Oxford and a Tutorial Fellow at St John's College, Oxford.

Early life and education
From 1974 to 1977, Purcell was an undergraduate at Worcester College, Oxford, graduating with a Bachelor of Arts (BA) degree. During his time Worcester College he was a student of Peter Brunt. He then became a prize-fellow at All Souls College, Oxford, until 1979. He does not have a doctorate.

Academic career
From 1979 until October 2011, he was a tutorial fellow at St John's College, Oxford, succeeding Nicholas Sherwin-White. He was elected as a Fellow of the British Academy (FBA) in 2007. Upon becoming Camden Professor of Ancient History in October 2011, he was elected a fellow of Brasenose College, Oxford.

Visiting appointments and lectures

In 1998 Purcell gave the Jerome lectures at the University of Michigan and in 2008 the Rostovtzeff lectures at Yale University. In 2010 he gave the Gray Lectures at the University of Cambridge. In 2012 Purcell became the 98th Sather Professor of Classical Literature at the University of California, Berkeley lecturing on 'Venal Histories: The Character, Limits, and Historical Importance of Buying and Selling in the Ancient World'. In 2012 he also gave the Charles Alexander Robinson, Jr. Memorial Lecture at Brown University entitled 'Roman Diasporas & Texture of Empire.' Purcell has also held the Chaire d'excellence Pierre de Fermat at the University of Toulouse II - Le Mirail.

Research

Purcell has research interests in the social, economic and cultural history of Rome and the City of Rome as well as the Mediterranean Sea and its history.

Purcell is known especially for his 'ecological view' of ancient history as well as his expertise in ancient Mediterranean history. The publication of his book The Corrupting Sea: A Study of Mediterranean History (co-written with Peregrine Horden) was hailed as a 'notable intellectual event'. The book's main thesis is that the Mediterranean is a region made up of micro-regions. The book argues that the Mediterranean ought to be seen in terms of the ecological lines of force linking countless small regions and micro-economies together rather than in terms of a few famous metropoleis. Purcell stresses the longues durées and insists that the different themes of history, i.e. politics, culture, economy, ideas and institutions must be studied in close association. Purcell is currently concerned with expanding this work and with situating the Mediterranean in even larger contexts so as to show how ancient history can be used to answer global historical questions.

Selected bibliography

References

External links 
 Mr Nicholas Purcell MA FBA Faculty homepage
 Professor Nicholas Purcell College homepage
 Nicholas Purcell – Quondam Fellow – All Souls College

Living people
British classical scholars
Historians of ancient Rome
Fellows of St John's College, Oxford
Fellows of All Souls College, Oxford
Alumni of Worcester College, Oxford
Fellows of the British Academy
Camden Professors of Ancient History
Fellows of Brasenose College, Oxford
Year of birth missing (living people)